Civil Bank Limited (CiBL) is a commercial bank in Nepal. Founded in 2010, the bank is an ‘A’ class commercial bank licensed by Nepal Rastra Bank and has branches all across the nation with its head office in Kathmandu which provides entire commercial banking services.

The bank was established with a paid up capital of NPR 1.20 billion later raised to 2.00 billion by issuing ordinary shares. The paid up capital of the bank has since been increased to NPR 2.69 billion after distribution of stock dividends and successful acquisition of former Axis Development Bank Limited and Civil Merchant Bittiya Sanstha Limited. The bank is under process of raising paid-up capital to 4.70 billion by acquiring International Leasing and Finance Company Limited. The bank's shares are publicly traded as an 'A' category company in the Nepal Stock Exchange.

See also

 List of banks in Nepal
 Commercial Banks of Nepal

References

 https://www.civilbank.com.np/senior-executives
 https://www.civilbank.com.np/board-of-directors

External links
 Official Website of Civil Bank Limited
 Official Website of Nepal Rastra Bank

Banks of Nepal
Banks established in 2010
2010 establishments in Nepal